In mathematical analysis, the Pólya–Szegő inequality (or Szegő inequality) states that the Sobolev energy of a function in a Sobolev space does not increase under symmetric decreasing rearrangement. The inequality is named after the mathematicians George Pólya and Gábor Szegő.

Mathematical setting and statement 

Given a Lebesgue measurable function the symmetric decreasing rearrangement  is the unique function such that for every  the sublevel set  is an open ball centred at the origin  that has the same Lebesgue measure as  

Equivalently,  is the unique radial and radially nonincreasing function, whose strict sublevel sets are open and have the same measure as those of the function .

The Pólya–Szegő inequality states that if moreover  then  and

Applications of the inequality 
The Pólya–Szegő inequality is used to prove the Rayleigh–Faber–Krahn inequality, which states that among all the domains of a given fixed volume, the ball has the smallest first eigenvalue for the Laplacian with Dirichlet boundary conditions. The proof goes by restating the problem as a minimization of the Rayleigh quotient.

The optimal constant in the Sobolev inequality can be obtained by combining the Pólya–Szegő inequality with some integral inequalities.

Equality cases 
Since the Sobolev energy is invariant under translations, any translation of a radial function achieves equality in the Pólya–Szegő inequality. There are however other functions that can achieve equality, obtained for example by taking a radial nonincreasing function that achieves its maximum on a ball of positive radius and adding to this function another function which is radial with respect to a different point and whose support is contained in the maximum set of the first function. In order to avoid this obstruction, an additional condition is thus needed.

It has been proved that if the function  achieves equality in the Pólya–Szegő inequality and if the set  is a null set for Lebesgue's measure, then the function  is radial and radially nonincreasing with respect to some point .

Generalizations 
The Pólya–Szegő inequality is still valid for symmetrizations on the sphere or the hyperbolic space.

The inequality also holds for partial symmetrizations defined by foliating the space into planes (Steiner symmetrization) and into spheres (cap symmetrization).

There are also Pólya−Szegő inequalities for rearrangements with respect to non-Euclidean norms and using the dual norm of the gradient.

Proofs of the inequality

Original proof by a cylindrical isoperimetric inequality 

The inequality is proved for a smooth function  that vanishes outside a compact subset of the Euclidean space  For every , they define the sets 

These areas can be computed by the area formula yielding the inequality

Since the sets  and  have the same measure, this is equivalent to

The conclusion then follows from the fact that

Coarea formula and isoperimetric inequality 
The Pólya–Szegő inequality can be proved by combining the coarea formula, Hölder’s inequality and the classical isoperimetric inequality.

If the function  is smooth enough, the coarea formula can be used to write

where  denotes the –dimensional Hausdorff measure on the Euclidean space . For almost every each , we have by Hölder's inequality,

Therefore, we have

Since the set  is a ball that has the same measure as the set , by the classical isoperimetric inequality, we have 

Moreover, recalling that the sublevel sets of the functions  and  have the same measure,

and therefore,

Since the function  is radial, one has

and the conclusion follows by applying the coarea formula again.

Rearrangement inequalities for convolution 
When , the Pólya–Szegő inequality can be proved by representing the Sobolev energy by the heat kernel. One begins by observing that 

Since for every  the function  is radial and radially decreasing, we have by the Riesz rearrangement inequality

Hence, we deduce that

References

Sobolev spaces
Geometric inequalities
Rearrangement inequalities